The Israel Journal of Psychiatry and Related Sciences is a medical journal that publishes original articles dealing with the bio-psycho-social aspects of mobility, relocation, acculturation, ethnicity, stress situations in war and peace, victimology, and mental health in developing countries. According to the Journal Citation Reports, the journal has a 2014 impact factor of 0.789.
In 2017, its name was changed to Israel journal of psychiatry.

References

External links

Medicine in Israel
Psychiatry journals
Publications established in 1966
Quarterly journals
English-language journals
Mental health in Israel